Geneviève Callerot (born 6 May 1916) is a French novelist and farmer. In World War II, with her father and sister, she assisted more than 200 people in passing the demarcation line from the occupied french territory to Zone libre, the unoccupied territory of Vichy France.

In 2018, at the age of 102, Callerot become a member of the Legion of Honour.

Biography 
Geneviève Callerot was born in Paris. Before end of World War I she escaped the Paris shelling by the German siege guns to Périgord and settled in Saint-Aulaye (Département Dordogne). She took homeschooling by her parents.

The armistice of 22 June 1940 set the Demarcation line separating the German occupied part of France to the zone libre near their residence. With her father and sister she started helping people passing the demarcation line. Until arrested and imprisoned for three weeks in October 1942, she helped Jews, children and wounded British and American soldiers to escape from the Nazi Regime occupied territory over two years.

After the war, she rented with her husband a farm. In the 1960s her Cousin, writer Jean-Charles discovered her skills in writing. Not longer wasting her talent the following decades, in 1983 her book Les Cinq Filles du Grand-Barrail became a success.

On 24 August 2018, she became a member of the Legion of Honour. The award was handed out by former member of departmental council of Dordogne Gérard Fayolle. Rejecting former offers, as an honor to her parents she accepted this award.

Publications 
 
 .
 .
 .

See also 
 List of Légion d'honneur recipients by name

References

External links 
 

1916 births
Writers from Paris
Living people
French literature
20th-century French women writers
21st-century French women writers
Chevaliers of the Légion d'honneur
French centenarians
Women centenarians